Vouneuil may refer to two communes in the Vienne department in western France:
 Vouneuil-sous-Biard
 Vouneuil-sur-Vienne